Banshee Peak is a 7,400+ ft summit located in Mount Rainier National Park in Pierce County of Washington state. As part of the Cascade Range, Banshee Peak is situated west of the Cowlitz Chimneys and east of Panhandle Gap, with the Sarvant Glacier set below its north cliff. Banshee Peak is a high remnant of bedded Ohanapecosh Formation lava flows.  Access is from Panhandle Gap via the Wonderland Trail. The broad summit has alpine tundra similar to that found on Burroughs Mountain. The Sunrise Historic District provides a viewpoint from which to see Banshee Peak when weather permits. The road to Sunrise is only open seasonally in the summer due to closure from snowpack.

Climate

Banshee Peak is located in the marine west coast climate zone of western North America. Most weather fronts originate in the Pacific Ocean, and travel northeast toward the Cascade Mountains. As fronts approach, they are forced upward by the peaks of the Cascade Range (Orographic lift), causing them to drop their moisture in the form of rain or snowfall onto the Cascades. As a result, the west side of the Cascades experiences high precipitation, especially during the winter months in the form of snowfall. During winter months, weather is usually cloudy, but, due to high pressure systems over the Pacific Ocean that intensify during summer months, there is often little or no cloud cover during the summer. Because of maritime influence, snow tends to be wet and heavy, resulting in high avalanche danger. Precipitation runoff from Banshee Peak drains into tributaries of the White River and the Cowlitz River.

References

External links
 National Park Service web site: Mount Rainier National Park

Cascade Range
Mountains of Pierce County, Washington
Mountains of Washington (state)
Mount Rainier National Park
North American 2000 m summits